Corynexochida is an order of trilobite that lived from the Lower Cambrian to the Late Devonian. Like many of the other trilobite orders, Corynexochida contains many species with widespread characteristics.

The middle region of the cephalon (the glabella) is typically elongate, with the sides often spreading forward (pestle-shaped). Some species have glabellae that are effaced, meaning they are smooth and show little detail. The glabellar furrows (when not effaced) typically have a splayed arrangement. In most species, the hind pair on either side of the cephalon become spines that point sharply backwards, and the spinose tips of the anterior pairs of thoracic segments tend to become more and more forward directed toward the pygidium. The eyes are typically large. Pygidia are typically large, competing in size with the cephalon in some species.

The tips of the thoracic segments of many Corynexochida species are spine-like (though in some species they are flush with the sides and smooth). The thorax can have 2-12 segments (rarely more), but they more typically have 7–8.

References
 Order Corynexochida - a site about the eight orders of trilobites.

 
Prehistoric arthropod orders
Cambrian trilobites
Ordovician trilobites
Silurian trilobites
Devonian trilobites
Trilobite orders
Cambrian Series 2 first appearances
Frasnian extinctions